Artificial seawater (abbreviated ASW) is a mixture of dissolved mineral salts (and sometimes vitamins) that simulates seawater. Artificial seawater is primarily used in marine biology and in marine and reef aquaria, and allows the easy preparation of media appropriate for marine organisms (including algae, bacteria, plants and animals). From a scientific perspective, artificial seawater has the advantage of reproducibility over natural seawater since it is a standardized formula. Artificial seawater is also known as synthetic seawater and substitute ocean water.

Example
The tables below present an example of an artificial seawater (35.00‰ of salinity) preparation devised by Kester, Duedall, Connors and Pytkowicz (1967).  The recipe consists of two lists of mineral salts, the first of anhydrous salts that can be weighed out, the second of hydrous salts that should be added to the artificial seawater as a solution.

While all of the compounds listed in the recipe above are inorganic, mineral salts, some artificial seawater recipes, such as Goldman and McCarthy (1978), make use of trace solutions of vitamins or organic compounds.

Standard
The International Standard for making artificial seawater can be found at ASTM International. The current standard is named ASTM D1141-98 (The original standard was ASTM D1141-52) and describes the standard practice for the preparation of substitute ocean water. 
The ASTM D1141-98 standard comes in a ready-made artificial seawater form or a "Sea Salt" mix that can be prepared by engineers and hobbyists. Generally, the ready-made artificial seawater comes in 1 gallon and 5 gallon containers, whereas the "Sea Salt" mix comes in 20lb pails (makes approximately 57 gallons) and 50lb pails (makes approximately 143 gallons).

Uses and applications
There are various applications for ASTM D1141-98 synthetic seawater including corrosion studies, ocean instrument calibration and chemical processing. Typically, laboratory-grade water is used when making synthetic salts

See also
 Algaculture
 Aquarium

References

External links
 Artificial seawater media, Goldman & McCarthy (1978)
 Modified Artificial Seawater Media (MASM), Culture Collection of Algae and Protozoa
 Synthetic Seawaters for Aquaria and Laboratories, Calypso Publications (1979)

Seaweeds
Aquariums
Aquatic ecology
Biological oceanography
Chemical oceanography
Liquid water
Marine biology
Planktology